Limbdi is one of the 182 Legislative Assembly constituencies of Gujarat state in India. It is part of Surendranagar district .

List of segments 
This assembly seat represents the following segments

 Chuda Taluka - entirely
 Sayla Taluka – Entire taluka except village – Ori
 Limbdi Taluka (Part) Villages – Aanandpar, Ankewaliya, Balol, Bhalgamda, Bhoika, Bhojpara, Bodiya, Borana, Borna, Choki, Choraniya, Devpara, Dholi, Dolatpar, Gedi, Ghaghretiya, Ghaghosar, Ghanshyampar, Hadala, Jakhan, Jansali, Jasapar, Kamalpur, Kanpara, Katariya, Khambhlav, the taluka seat: Limbdi (M), Liyad, Mota Timbla, Nana Timbla, Natwargadh, Pandri, Panshina, Ralol, Ramrajpar, Samla, Raska, Sauka, Tokrala, Ughal, Umedpar, Untadi, Vakhatpar, Zamdi

Members of Legislative Assembly 
2007 - Kiritsinh Rana, Bharatiya Janata Party
2012 - Somabhai Kolipatel, Indian National Congress
2013 - Kiritsinh Rana, Bharatiya Janata Party
2017 - Somabhai Kolipatel Indian National Congress
2020 - Kiritsinh Rana , Bharatiya Janata Party

Election results

2022

2020 By-poll

2017

2013

2012

See also
 List of constituencies of the Gujarat Legislative Assembly
 Surendranagar district

References

External links
 

Assembly constituencies of Gujarat
Surendranagar district